Peng Chau Ferry Pier or Peng Chau Pier is a ferry pier in Lo Peng Street, Peng Chau, New Territories, Hong Kong, next to Peng Chau Public Pier. Two ferry routes are operated at the pier. One is the service between Peng Chau and Central, operated by Hong Kong & Kowloon Ferry. The other is the "Inter-Island" service among Peng Chau, Lantau Island (Mui Wo, Chi Ma Wan) and Cheung Chau, operated by Sun Ferry.

References

Piers in Hong Kong
Peng Chau